Byeollae station is a railway station of the Gyeongchun Line that opened in December 2012. It is located at Byeollae-dong, Namyangju-si, Gyeonggi-do, South Korea. The Seoul Subway Line 8 is being extended to this station with an opening date in 2023.

Station layout

Gallery

Seoul Metropolitan Subway stations
Metro stations in Namyangju
Railway stations opened in 2012